Warp is a character appearing in American comic books published by DC Comics.

Publication history
Warp first appeared in The New Teen Titans #14 (December 1981) and was created by George Pérez and Marv Wolfman.

Fictional character biography
The origin of Emil LaSalle is unknown. This French supervillain had previously fought Phantasmo and Fleur-de-Lis, prior to being approached by the Brain, Monsieur Mallah, and Phobia to become part of their new Brotherhood of Evil. At first, Warp refused but, after being attacked by Captain Toulon and trapped on the "Earth-11" alternate Earth, Warp changed his mind and joined the group (the whole affair had been engineered by Doctor Mist to get rid of Toulon and save the survivors of that alternate Earth).

Warp has fought the Teen Titans on different occasions, later resurfacing with the other Brotherhood of Evil members who were then called the Society of Sin.

When the Joker altered the sanity of dozens of supervillains, Warp was one of those affected. He attacked the United Nations building, sending the top halves of many people into deep space.

In the Villains United "Infinite Crisis" special, Warp, now partially cured, was with the Brotherhood of Evil when they appear as members of Alexander Luthor Jr.'s Secret Society of Super Villains. He was seen working with Doctor Psycho to free Doomsday from captivity near the center of the Earth.

He kidnapped Icemaiden, a service paid for by Delores Winters. Winters stole Icemaiden's skin, but the heroine survived, now in a comatose state in S.T.A.R. Labs.

During the One Year Later story, Warp rejoined the Brotherhood of Evil.

In "Salvation Run', he was used by Lex Luthor as a component in a teleportation device and was killed when it self-destructed.

In 2011 "The New 52" rebooted the DC universe. Warp is a member of The Brotherhood of Evil. He and the rest of the team are battling Blue Beetle in his new title.

During the "Forever Evil" storyline, Warp is among the villains recruited by the Crime Syndicate to join the Secret Society of Super Villains.

Powers and abilities
Besides flying, Warp can open portals between any two locations that he chooses and travel through them and bring others through it as well. Repeated use of this power tires him out.

In other media
 Warp appeared in Teen Titans, voiced by Xander Berkeley. This version is a time-traveling supervillain from a century in the future. After running afoul of the Teen Titans in the episode "How Long is Forever?", Warp later joins the Brotherhood of Evil in their plot to eliminate young heroes around the world, only to be flash-frozen by the Titans.
 Warp appears in Smallville, portrayed by Elias Toufexis. This version is a member of the Suicide Squad who lacks the ability to fly.

References

External links
 Warp's Bio

Characters created by George Pérez
Characters created by Marv Wolfman
Comics characters introduced in 1981
DC Comics characters who can teleport
DC Comics metahumans
DC Comics supervillains
Fictional French people
Suicide Squad members